The UK Singles Chart is one of many music charts compiled by the Official Charts Company that calculates the best-selling singles of the week in the United Kingdom. Before 2004, the chart was only based on the sales of physical singles. This list shows singles that peaked in the Top 10 of the UK Singles Chart during 1968, as well as singles which peaked in 1967 and 1969 but were in the top 10 in 1968. The entry date is when the single appeared in the top 10 for the first time (week ending, as published by the Official Charts Company, which is six days after the chart is announced).

One-hundred and eleven singles were in the top ten in 1968. Ten singles from 1967 remained in the top 10 for several weeks at the beginning of the year, while "Albatross" by Fleetwood Mac and "Ob-La-Di, Ob-La-Da" by Marmalade were both released in 1968 but did not reach their peak until 1969. "All My Love" by Cliff Richard, "Daydream Believer" by The Monkees, "Magical Mystery Tour (EP)" by The Beatles and "Thank U Very Much" by The Scaffold were the singles from 1967 to reach their peak in 1968. Nineteen artists scored multiple entries in the top 10 in 1968. Amen Corner, Fleetwood Mac, Joe Cocker, Nina Simone and Status Quo were among the many artists who achieved their first UK charting top 10 single in 1968.

The 1967 Christmas number-one, "Hello Goodbye" by The Beatles, remained at number-one for the first four weeks of 1968. The first new number-one single of the year was "The Ballad of Bonnie and Clyde" by Georgie Fame. Overall, twenty different singles peaked at number-one in 1968, with The Beatles (2) having the joint most singles hit that position.

Background

Multiple entries
One-hundred and eleven singles charted in the top 10 in 1968, with one-hundred and three singles reaching their peak this year.

Nineteen artists scored multiple entries in the top 10 in 1968. The Beatles secured the record for most top 10 hits in 1968 with four hit singles.

Manfred Mann was one of a number of artists with two top-ten entries, including the number-one single "The Mighty Quinn (Quinn the Eskimo)". Amen Corner, Bee Gees, Donovan, Lulu and Status Quo were among the other artists who had multiple top 10 entries in 1968.

Chart debuts
Forty-nine artists achieved their first top 10 single in 1968, either as a lead or featured artist. Of these, four went on to record another hit single that year: Amen Corner, Don Partridge, Marmalade and Status Quo. Love Affair had two other entries in their breakthrough year.

The following table (collapsed on desktop site) does not include acts who had previously charted as part of a group and secured their first top 10 solo single.

Notes
Johnny Johnson was lead singer for The Bandwagon and was given an individual credit for their first release to reach the top 10, "Breakin' Down the Walls of Heartache". The group later became referred to as Johnny Johnson and the Bandwagon.

Songs from films
Original songs from various films entered the top 10 throughout the year. These included "Mrs. Robinson" (from The Graduate) and "Les Bicyclettes de Belsize" (Les Bicyclettes de Belsize).

Additionally, "The Good, the Bad and the Ugly (Il buono, il brutto, il cattivo)" from the film of the same name, originally recorded by Ennio Morricone, topped the chart when it was covered by Hugo Montenegro.

Best-selling singles

Until 1970 there was no universally recognised year-end best-sellers list. However, in 2011 the Official Charts Company released a list of the best-selling single of each year in chart history from 1952 to date. According to the list, "Hey Jude" by The Beatles is officially recorded as the biggest-selling single of 1968.

Top-ten singles
Key

Entries by artist

The following table shows artists who achieved two or more top 10 entries in 1968, including singles that reached their peak in 1967 or 1969. The figures include both main artists and featured artists. The total number of weeks an artist spent in the top ten in 1968 is also shown.

Notes

 "Ob-La-Di, Ob-La-Da" reached its peak of number-one on 7 January 1969 (week ending).
 "Albatross" reached its peak of number one on 4 February 1969.
 "All My Love" re-entered the top 10 at number 7 on 26 December 1967 (week ending).
 "Here We Go Round the Mulberry Bush" re-entered the top 10 at number 10 on 16 January 1968 (week ending).
 "Suddenly You Love Me" re-entered the top 10 at number 10 on 5 March 1968 (week ending).
 "(Sittin' On) The Dock of the Bay" was released posthumously following Otis Redding's death in a plane crash.
"Congratulations" was the United Kingdom's entry at the Eurovision Song Contest in 1968.
 "A Man Without Love" was first performed in Italian (recorded as "Quando m'innamoro") by both Anna Identici and The Sandpipers at the 1968 Sanremo Music Festival.
 "White Horses" was the theme song to the UK dub of the German/Yugoslavian television series "The White Horses".
 "This Guy's in Love with You" re-entered the top 10 at number 5 on 13 August 1968 (week ending) for 7 weeks.
 "Help Yourself" was first performed in Italian (recorded as "Gli occhi miei") by both Dino and Wilma Goich at the 1968 Sanremo Music Festival.
 "High in the Sky" re-entered the top 10 at number 10 on 8 October 1968 (week ending).
 "Jesamine" re-entered the top 10 at number 10 on 19 November 1968 (week ending).
 Figure includes single that peaked in 1967.
 Figure includes single that first charted in 1967 but peaked in 1968.
 Figure includes single that peaked in 1969.

See also
1968 in British music
List of number-one singles from the 1960s (UK)

References
General

Specific

External links
1968 singles chart archive at the Official Charts Company (click on relevant week)

Top 10 singles
United Kingdom
1968